KWSU (1250 AM) is a non-commercial radio station licensed to Pullman, Washington. The station is owned by Washington State University, and is the flagship of Northwest Public Broadcasting's National Public Radio News network.  It airs a schedule of news and talk programming from NPR, American Public Media and Public Radio International, as well as locally produced offerings.

History

Washington State University was known as the State College of Washington beginning in 1905. Research at the college in radio communication, initially with Morse code transmissions using spark transmitters, reportedly began in 1908. In early 1916 the college was issued a license for a "Technical and Training School" station, with the call sign 7YI. However, in April 1917, due to the entrance of the United States into World War One, most non-government stations were ordered to cease operations. 

Effective December 1, 1921, the Commerce Department, which regulated radio at this time, adopted regulations formally defining "broadcasting stations". The wavelength of 360 meters (833 kHz) was designated for entertainment broadcasts, while 485 meters (619 kHz) was reserved for broadcasting official weather and other government reports.

On June 21, 1922, the State College of Washington was issued a license for a new station operating on 360 meters in Pullman. This station was issued the call letters KFAE, which were randomly assigned from an alphabetical roster of available call signs. Construction was financed by Associated Students along with the Pullman Chamber of Commerce. The station was erected by the experimental engineering department at an estimated cost of $1,000 to $2,000, for a savings of between $9,000 and $10,000. Dean H. V. Carpenter of the engineering college initially hoped to have KFAE operational by September 1, prior to the September 19 start of the fall semester.

KFAE's formal debut, using a 5 watt transmitter, was delayed until December 10. The station's studio and transmitter were located in adjoining rooms in the basement of the Mechanic Arts Building. A transmitting antenna was constructed on the building roof, consisting of 6 wires strung between two 70-foot (21 meter) tall towers. In mid-1923 the station's regular schedule was from 7 to 8 p.m. on Monday, Wednesday and Friday evenings.

In early 1924, KFAE was assigned to 908 kHz, which was changed to 900 kHz a year later, 860 kHz shortly thereafter, to 760 in 1927, and to 1390 kHz on November 11, 1928, under the provisions of the Federal Radio Commission's General Order 40.

In the summer of 1925, the station's call letters were changed from KFAE to KWSC, to reflect the college. In late 1929 KWSC was moved to 1220 kHz, and beginning in 1931 KTW in Seattle moved to this frequency on a timesharing basis. On March 29, 1941, along with all the other stations on 1220 kHz, KWSC and KTW moved to 1250 kHz, the frequency KWSU has occupied ever since, as part of the implementation of the North American Regional Broadcasting Agreement.

For many years KWSC served a large portion of the Pacific Northwest. Edward R. Murrow began his career at the station, in addition to Keith Jackson and Barry Serafin. In July 1935, a major fire swept the station, which remained off the air until the following September. In 1944, the station was operating for 89 hours per week. 

The call letters were changed to KWSU on March 1, 1969, ten years after Washington State attained university status. KWSU was a charter member of NPR, and was one of the 90 stations that carried the inaugural broadcast of All Things Considered in 1971. Studios moved to the third floor of the east wing of the Murrow Communications Center in the 1970s.

References

External links

FCC History Cards for KWSU (covering 1927-1980 as KWSC / KWSU)
Northwest Public Broadcasting

WSU (AM)
WSU
NPR member stations
Pullman, Washington
Radio stations established in 1922
1922 establishments in Washington (state)
Radio stations licensed before 1923 and still broadcasting